The Washington State Park System is a set of state parks owned by the state government of Washington, USA. They are managed by the Washington State Parks and Recreation Commission. There are over 140 parks throughout the state, including 19 marine parks and 11 Historical Parks.
The park system was established in 1913 by the creation of the Washington State Board of Park Commissioners. The first two parks were formed from donated land in 1915, and by 1929 the state had seven parks. In 1947 the State Parks Committee was renamed to the Washington State Parks and Recreation Commission and given authority to oversee the state park system. By 1960 the number of state parks had increased to 130.

In 2003, the Washington State Legislature introduced a $5-a-day parking fee, meant to fund park-related construction projects; more than a quarter of the fees collected went into the fee-collection system itself. Park use decreased more than 15% under the fees. The fee was rescinded in early 2006, returning the state park system to its status of the only system in the West without day-use fees. In 2011 the legislature enacted a $10 day-use permit and a $30 annual pass, called the Discover Pass, for vehicles to enter state parks, lands owned or managed by the Washington Department of Fish and Wildlife, and designated lands of the Washington Department of Natural Resources. Funds generated from the sale of the Discover Pass are deposited into the Recreation Access Pass Account. The new fees did not raise as much money as was hoped, though another effort to encourage donation when renewing certain state licenses (including driver's licenses) was more successful than officials expected.

Map

Current state parks

Former state parks

See also
List of national parks of the United States

References

External links
Washington State Parks and Recreation Commission
Washington State Parks Foundation

 
Washington state parks
State parks